Victoria Rodríguez and Ana Sofía Sánchez were the defending champions but chose not to participate.

Olivia Gadecki and Rebeka Masarova won the title, defeating Celia Cerviño Ruiz and Olivia Nicholls in the final, 6–3, 6–3.

Seeds

Draw

Draw

References
Main Draw

Open Araba en Femenino - Doubles